The St. Cloud VA Health Care System is a medical facility of the United States Department of Veterans Affairs (VA) in St. Cloud, Minnesota.  It was established in 1923.

In 2012 the complex was listed as the St. Cloud Veterans Administration Hospital Historic District on the National Register of Historic Places for its state-level significance in the themes of architecture, health/medicine, and politics/government.  It was nominated for the local political efforts towards its establishment, its impact on health care for Minnesota veterans, and its Colonial and Classical Revival architecture.  The historic district contains 34 contributing properties built 1923–1950.

See also
List of Veterans Affairs medical facilities
List of hospitals in Minnesota
National Register of Historic Places listings in Stearns County, Minnesota
Minneapolis VA Health Care System

References

External links
 St. Cloud VA Health Care System

1923 establishments in Minnesota
Historic districts on the National Register of Historic Places in Minnesota
Hospital buildings completed in 1923
Hospital buildings on the National Register of Historic Places in Minnesota
Hospitals in Minnesota
National Register of Historic Places in Stearns County, Minnesota
St. Cloud, Minnesota
Veterans Affairs medical facilities
Hospitals established in 1923